The women's heptathlon event at the 2007 World Championships in Athletics took place from August 25–26, 2007 at the Nagai Stadium in Osaka, Japan. The competition is notable for having the highest number of competitors (39) in the World Championships history.

Medalists

Schedule

August 25, 2007

August 26, 2007

Records

Overall results
Points table after 7th event

References

Results
100 m hurdles, high jump, shot put, 200 m, long jump, javelin, 800 m - IAAF.org
Final standings - IAAF.org

Event reports
 100 m hurdles, high jump, shot put, 200 m, long jump, javelin throw, 800 m - IAAF.org

Heptathlon
Heptathlon at the World Athletics Championships
2007 in women's athletics